Danijel Žeželj is a Croatian comic book artist, animator, painter and illustrator and author of a number of graphic novels.

Biography
Žeželj studied classical painting, sculpting and printing at the Academy of Fine Arts in Zagreb, Croatia.

His work has been published and exhibited in Croatia, Slovenia, UK, Switzerland, France, Italy, Spain, Greece, Sweden, South Africa, Argentina, Brazil and the USA.

His comics and illustrations have been published abroad by DC Comics/Vertigo, Marvel Comics, The New York Times Book Review, Harper's Magazine, San Francisco Guardian, Editori del Grifo, Edizioni Charta and others.

Since 1999, in collaboration with musician/composer Jessica Lurie, he has created a series of multimedia performances merging live music with live painting. These have been presented at festivals and in clubs, churches and squats throughout Europe and the USA.

In 2005 he became the first comic book artist ever to have a solo exhibition at the Isabella Stewart Gardner Museum in Boston, Massachusetts.

In 2001 in Zagreb, Croatia he founded the publishing house and graphic workshop "Petikat". Most recently he worked on animated films at Zagreb Film.

He lives and works both in New York and Zagreb. He was married to Jessica Lurie, a composer and musician.

Bibliography 
Luna Park, written by Kevin Baker, DC Comics/Vertigo, USA, 2009
King of Nekropolis, Hazard Edizioni, Italy, 2007
Stray Dogs, ISGM/Charta, USA, 2005
Small Hands, Petikat, Croatia, 2004; Edizioni Di, Italy, 2005
Caballo, Petikat, Croatia, 2004
Reflex Petikat, Croatia, 2003
Superman: Metropolis, DC Comics, USA, 2003
Stazione Topolo`, Grifo Edizioni, Italy, 2002Bolivian Dark, Petikat, Croatia, 2002The Call of Duty: The Wagon, written by Chuck Austen, Marvel, USA, 2002Captain America: Dead Men Running, written by Darko Macan, Marvel, USA, 200224 Hours, Grifo Edizioni, Italy, 2002Rinzol, Petikat, Croatia, 2001Sandman Presents: Corinthian: Death in Venice, written by Darko Macan, DC Comics/Vertigo, USA, 2001El Diablo, written by Brian Azzarello, DC Comics/Vertigo, USA, 2001Air Mexico, Clandestino, USA, 2000Il Sorriso di Majakovskij, Edizioni Di, Italy, 2000Reve de Beton, Mosquito, France, 2000Congo Bill, written by Scott Cunningham, DC Comics/Vertigo, USA, 1999; Mosquito, France, 2000; Magic Press, Italy, 2001Invitation a la Danse, Mosquito, France, 1999L'Amore, Edizioni Di, Italy, 1999La Peste, Edizioni Di, Italy, 1998Amazonia, Edizioni Di, Italy, 1998L'Angelo Sterminatore, Edizioni Di, Italy, 1997Pagliacci: In Your Eyes: Blues, Liberty, Italy, 1996Rex, Radio 101, Croatia, 1995; Edizioni Di, Italy, 2000; Mosquito, France, 2001Sophia, Editori del Grifo, Italy, 1994; X-press & Radio 101, Croatia, 1994Sun City, Editori del Grifo, Italy, 1994; Kaspar & Radio 101, Croatia, 1993, Coma 22, Italy, 2007Il Ritmo del Cuore'', Editori del Grifo, Italy, 1993; Mosquito, France, 2005

Notes

General references

Danijel Žeželj at Lambiek's Comiclopedia

External links 

Biography on petikat.com
Isabella Stewart Gardner Museum
HighBeam Research
mirada.it

Living people
1966 births
Croatian comics artists
Croatian animators
Croatian comics writers
Croatian illustrators
Harper's Magazine people